For information on all Lamar University sports, see Lamar Cardinals and Lady Cardinals

The 2020 Lamar Lady Cardinals softball team represented Lamar University in the 2020 NCAA Division I softball season.  The Lady Cardinals played their home games at Lamar Softball Complex and are members of the Southland Conference.  The team was coached by Amy Hooks in her second season at Lamar.  On March 12, the Southland Conference announced a suspension of Spring sports through March 30  due to the COVID-19 pandemic.  The conference announced that all remaining Spring 2020 sports contests were cancelled on March 14.
The Lady Cardinals played 20 games in the shortened season with an overall record of 8–12, and a 0–3 record in conference play.

Previous season
In 2019, the Lady Cardinals  finished the season 7th in the Southland with a record of 23–34, 14–13 in conference play. They lost to Northwestern State in the first round of the 2019 Southland Conference softball tournament.

Southland Conference Coaches and Sports Information Directors Poll
The Southland Conference Coaches and Sports Information Directors Poll was released on January 30, 2020. Lamar was picked to finish eighth in the Southland Conference with 110 votes.

Preseason All-Southland Conference team
The preseason all-conference team is based on votes by the conference head coaches.  Players who were named to the previous season's first and second teams are automatically named to the preseason team for their respective positions.
Kaylyn Shepherd* (UCA, SR, 1st Base)
Cayla Jones* (NWSU, JR, 2nd Base)
Cylla Hill* (UCA, SR, 3rd Base)
Tiffany Thompson* (SHSU, SR, Shortstop)
Ella Manzer* (SLU, JR, Catcher)
Jade Lewis* (LU, SR, Designated Player/Pitcher)
Megan McDonald* (SHSU, SR, Outfield)
Madisen Blackford* (SLU, JR, Outfield)
Kayla Crutchmer* (UCA, SR, Outfield)
Kassidy Wilbur* (SFA, SO, Pitcher)
Alley McDonald* (SLU, SR, Pitcher)
Alexsandra Flores* (MSU, SR, Pitcher)
E.C. Delafield* (NWSU, JR, Utility)
2019 All-Conference Designation

Roster

Coaches

Schedule

References

Lamar Lady Cardinals softball seasons
Lamar
Lamar Lady Cardinals softball team
Lamar Cardinals baseball team